In geometry, an edge-contracted icosahedron is a polyhedron with 18 triangular faces, 27 edges, and 11 vertices.

Construction 
It can be constructed from the regular icosahedron, with one edge contraction, removing one vertex, 3 edges, and 2 faces. This contraction distorts the circumscribed sphere original vertices. With all equilateral triangle faces, it has 2 sets of 3 coplanar equilateral triangles (each forming a half-hexagon), and thus is not a Johnson solid. 

If the sets of three coplanar triangles are considered a single face (called a triamond), it has 10 vertices, 22 edges, and 14 faces, 12 triangles  and 2 triamonds .

It may also be described as having a hybrid square-pentagonal antiprismatic core (an antiprismatic core with one square base and one pentagonal base); each base is then augmented with a pyramid.

Related polytopes 
The dissected regular icosahedron is a variant topologically equivalent to the sphenocorona with the two sets of 3 coplanar faces as trapezoids. This is the vertex figure of a 4D polytope, grand antiprism. It has 10 vertices, 22 edges, and 12 equilateral triangular faces and 2 trapezoid faces.

In chemistry
In chemistry, this polyhedron is most commonly called the octadecahedron, for 18 triangular faces, and represents the closo-boranate .

Related polyhedra 
The elongated octahedron is similar to the edge-contracted icosahedron, but instead of only one edge contracted, two opposite edges are contracted.

References

External links 
 The Convex Deltahedra, And the Allowance of Coplanar Faces

Polyhedra